James Brandt Curran (born August 19, 1986) is an American rapper, singer, songwriter, and record producer. James is more commonly known by his stage name JTM, formerly James the Mormon. Although he doesn't make religious music, he self-identifies as a religious person. JTM is a member of the Church of Jesus Christ of Latter-day Saints.

Music career 
JTM started posting videos on his YouTube channel in 2014 which attracted much attention from his religious community. He then released I'm Not a Rapper, anticipating that rapping would just be a hobby for him. I'm Not a Rapper reached No. 1 on the Billboard Heatseekers chart.

JTM followed up his debut EP with the release of Pmg. The music on the album is influenced by religious themes including missionary work. Concerning the inspiration of making a religiously inspired EP JTM stated "I do not make Christian or Mormon music,"... "I want to reach the kid who feels obligated to go to church or is struggling with his or her testimony. I want to reach non-members and show them that there are Mormons just like them. And that Mormons listen to rap and are cool. I hate that myths and poor stereotypes of the Church hold people back from something so beautiful." "Workin", featuring David Archuleta was released.

On May 2, 2018, JTM released his first full-length LP: We Came to Play, which reached No. 7 on the Billboard Heatseekers chart. JTM donated 50% of the proceeds from the album's pre-order sales to Operation Underground Railroad, a charity dedicated to rescuing children from sex trafficking.

In 2019 JTM released a music video on YouTube entitled "I Will Never Stop II".

Discography

Studio albums

Singles

References

American hip hop musicians
1986 births
Living people
Latter Day Saints from Utah
American expatriates in China
American Mormon missionaries in Russia
African-American Latter Day Saints
Brigham Young University–Idaho alumni